The 2023 East Carolina Pirates football team will represent East Carolina University during the 2023 NCAA Division I FBS football season. The Pirates play their home games at Dowdy-Ficklen Stadium in Greenville, North Carolina, and compete as members of the American Athletic Conference. They are led by head coach Mike Houston, in his fith season.

Previous season

The Pirates finished the 2022 season 8–5, 4–4 in Sun Belt play to finish in sixth place in the conference. They beat  Coastal Carolina 53–29 in the Birmingham Bowl.

Schedule
East Carolina and the American Athletic Conference (AAC) announced the 2023 football schedule on February 21, 2023.

References

East Carolina
East Carolina Pirates football seasons
East Carolina Pirates football